This is the results breakdown of the local elections held in Andalusia on 8 May 1983. The following tables show detailed results in the autonomous community's most populous municipalities, sorted alphabetically.

Overall

City control
The following table lists party control in the most populous municipalities, including provincial capitals (shown in bold). Gains for a party are displayed with the cell's background shaded in that party's colour.

Municipalities

Alcalá de Guadaíra
Population: 45,577

Algeciras
Population: 85,390

Almería
Population: 140,745

Antequera
Population: 35,765

Benalmádena
Population: 13,622

Cádiz
Population: 156,711

Chiclana de la Frontera
Population: 36,492

Córdoba
Population: 279,386

Dos Hermanas
Population: 57,548

Écija
Population: 34,703

El Ejido
Population: 29,560

El Puerto de Santa María
Population: 55,748

Fuengirola
Population: 29,160

Granada
Population: 246,642

Huelva
Population: 127,822

Jaén
Population: 95,783

Jerez de la Frontera
Population: 175,653

La Línea de la Concepción
Population: 56,609

Linares
Population: 55,122

Málaga
Population: 502,232

Marbella
Population: 60,172

Morón de la Frontera
Population: 27,986

Motril
Population: 40,506

Ronda
Population: 30,762

San Fernando
Population: 72,103

Sanlúcar de Barrameda
Population: 48,390

Seville

Population: 645,817

Utrera
Population: 38,097

Vélez-Málaga
Population: 41,937

References

Andalusia
1983